The 1950 National League Division Two was the fifth post-war season of the second tier of motorcycle speedway in Great Britain.

Summary
The League was extended again to 15 teams with the promotion from Division Three of Halifax Dukes, Plymouth, Yarmouth and Hanley. Bristol Bulldogs, champions for the previous two seasons, moved up to Division One.

Norwich Stars claimed the title by a single point.

On 1 July 1950, two riders were killed on the same night. Jock Shead riding for Halifax Dukes was killed at The Firs Stadium, (the third rider in four years to be killed at the track) during the semi final of the National Trophy. Shead's bike collided with another bike and he somersaulted before landing, he was take to hospital but died shortly afterwards. A second rider was killed on the same night in a division 1 fixture.

Final table

Top Five Riders (League only)

National Trophy Stage Two
The 1950 National Trophy was the 13th edition of the Knockout Cup. The Trophy consisted of three stages; stage one was for the third division clubs, stage two was for the second division clubs and stage three was for the top tier clubs. The winner of stage one would qualify for stage two and the winner of stage two would qualify for the third and final stage. Halifax won stage two and therefore qualified for stage three.

 For Stage One - see Stage One
 For Stage Three - see Stage Three

Second Division Qualifying First round

Second Division Qualifying Second round

Second Division Qualifying semifinals

Second Division Qualifying final

First leg

Second leg

See also
List of United Kingdom Speedway League Champions
Knockout Cup (speedway)

References

Speedway National League Division Two
Speedway National League Division 2
1950 in speedway